The Gale–Ryser theorem is a result in graph theory and combinatorial matrix theory, two branches of combinatorics. It provides one of two known approaches to solving the bipartite realization problem, i.e. it gives a necessary and sufficient condition for two finite sequences of natural numbers to be the degree sequence of a labeled simple bipartite graph; a sequence obeying these conditions is called "bigraphic". It is an analog of the Erdős–Gallai theorem for simple graphs. The theorem was published independently in 1957 by H. J. Ryser and David Gale.

Statement

Remark
Sometimes this theorem is stated with the additional constraint . This condition is not necessary, because the labels of vertices of one partite set in a bipartite graph can be switched arbitrarily.
In 1962 Ford and Fulkerson  gave a different but equivalent formulation for the theorem.

Other notations
The theorem can also be stated in terms of zero-one matrices. Each sequence can also be considered as a partition of the same number . The conjugate partition can be determined by a Ferrers diagram. Moreover, there is a connection to the relation majorization. Since , the theorem above states that a pair of nonnegative integer sequences a and b with nonincreasing a is bigraphic if and only if the conjugate partition  of  majorizes . 
A third formulation is in terms of degree sequences of simple directed graphs with at most one loop per vertex. In this case the matrix is interpreted as the adjacency matrix of such a directed graph. When are pairs of nonnegative integers  the indegree-outdegree pairs of a labeled directed graph with at most one loop per vertex? The theorem can easily be adapted to this formulation, because there does not exist a special order of b.

Proofs
The proof is composed of two parts: the necessity of the condition and its sufficiency. We outline the proof of both parts in the language of matrices. To see that the condition in the theorem is necessary, consider the adjacency matrix of a bigraphic realization with row sums  and column sums , and shift all ones in the matrix to the left. The row sums remain, while the column sums are now . The operation of shifting all ones to the left increases a partition in majorization order, and so  majorizes .

The original proof of sufficiency of the condition was rather complicated.  gave a simple algorithmic proof. The algorithm runs in at most  steps, in each of which a single one entry is moved to the right.

Stronger version

Generalization
This yields to the result that regular sequences have for fixed numbers of vertices and edges the largest number of bigraphic realizations, if n divides m. They are the contrary sequences of threshold sequences with only one unique bigraphic realization, which is known as threshold graph. Minconvex sequences generalize this concept if n does not divide m.

Characterizations for similar problems
Similar theorems describe the degree sequences of simple graphs and simple directed graphs. The first problem is characterized by the Erdős–Gallai theorem. The latter case is characterized by the Fulkerson–Chen–Anstee theorem.

Notes

References

.
.

Theorems in graph theory